Novopokrovka is a rural locality (a selo) and the administrative center of Novopokrovsky Selsoviet of Bystroistoksky District, Altai Krai, Russia. The population was 928 as of 2016. There are 9 streets.

Geography 
Novopokrovka is located on the left bank of the Anuy River, 22 km south of Bystry Istok (the district's administrative centre) by road. Verkh-Anuyskoye is the nearest rural locality.

Ethnicity 
The village is inhabited by Russians and others.

References 

Rural localities in Bystroistoksky District